Zerynthia polyxena, the southern festoon, is a butterfly belonging to the butterfly family Papilionidae.

Subspecies and forms 
Under the rules of the International Code of Zoological Nomenclature, Article 1.3.4, names used only below the rank of subspecies do not enter into consideration in zoological nomenclature; infrasubspecific names do not have formally recognized authorship, and do not compete for priority or homonymy with names used for species or subspecies. Accordingly, all of the names used for "forms" of Z. polyxena listed below must be disregarded as having no nomenclatural standing whatsoever, even though many are presented with authors and dates.

Subspecies and forms include:

 Zerynthia polyxena polyxena (Denis & Schiffermüller, 1775) in Italy
 Zerynthia polyxena polyxena f. punctata Schultz, 1908
 Zerynthia polyxena polyxena f. marpha Schultz, 1908
 Zerynthia polyxena polyxena f. rubra Hoffmann], 1916
 Zerynthia polyxena polyxena f. bella Neuburger, 1903
 Zerynthia polyxena polyxena f. bipunctata Cosmovici, 1892
 Zerynthia polyxena polyxena f. meridionalis Hoffmann, 1916
 Zerynthia polyxena polyxena f. tripunctata Zelezny, 1916
 Zerynthia polyxena polyxena f. nora Schultz, 1908 (kreusa Tomala)
 Zerynthia polyxena polyxena f. muelleri Bryk, 1921 (mulleri Bryk, recte muelleri)
 Zerynthia polyxena polyxena f. springeri Ronnicke, 1906
 Zerynthia polyxena polyxena f. reducta Zelezny, 1915
 Zerynthia polyxena polyxena f. nigromaculata Zelezny, 1915
 Zerynthia polyxena polyxena f. unimaculata Zelezny, 1915
 Zerynthia polyxena polyxena f. demaculata Schultz, 1908
 Zerynthia polyxena polyxena f. confluens Schultz, 1908
 Zerynthia polyxena polyxena f. lateviltata Schultz, 1908
 Zerynthia polyxena polyxena f. fasciata Begrer, 1919
 Zerynthia polyxena polyxena f. skalae Zelezny, 1917
 Zerynthia polyxena polyxena f. derubescens Zullich, 1928
 Zerynthia polyxena polyxena f. alba Esper, 1805
 Zerynthia polyxena polyxena f. subalba Schultz, 1908
 Zerynthia polyxena polyxena f. rufescens Oberthür, 1879
 Zerynthia polyxena polyxena f. meta Meigen
 Zerynthia polyxena polyxena f. ochracea Staudinger, 1861
 Zerynthia polyxena polyxena f. cellopura Eisner
 Zerynthia polyxena polyxena f. basinigra Eisner
 Zerynthia polyxena polyxena f. quincunx Eisner
 Zerynthia polyxena polyxena f. divisa Schultz, 1908
 Zerynthia polyxena polyxena f. ornata Eisner
 Zerynthia polyxena polyxena f. vitrina Rothschild
 Zerynthia polyxena polyxena f. irregularis Holland
 Zerynthia polyxena aemiliae Rocci, 1929 in North Italy; Lombardy: Massa Lombarda, Modena, Livorno
 Zerynthia polyxena albanica Riemel, 1927 in Albania
 Zerynthia polyxena australis (Esper, 1780) (medesicaste Hoffmannsegg) (south France: Provence - east Pyrenees)
 Zerynthia polyxena australis f. alicea Neuburger, 1903
 Zerynthia polyxena australis f. paucipunctata Neuburger
 Zerynthia polyxena australis f. tristis Verity
 Zerynthia polyxena australis f. divisa Schultez
 Zerynthia polyxena australis f. hartmanni Staudfuss, 1896
 Zerynthia polyxena australis f. unipunctata Eisner, 1954
 Zerynthia polyxena australis f. minusculus Eisner
 Zerynthia polyxena australis f. vitrina Rothschild sensu Eisner
 Zerynthia polyxena australis f. aperta Eisner, 1954
 Zerynthia polyxena australis f. quincunx Eisner
 Zerynthia polyxena australis f. honnerathii Boisduval, 1832
 Zerynthia polyxena australis f. albescens Eisner
 Zerynthia polyxena australis f. binaria Eisner
 Zerynthia polyxena bosniensis Eisner, 1974 in Bosnia
 Zerynthia polyxena bosniensis f. ochracea Staudinger, 1861
 Zerynthia polyxena bosniensis f.reducta Zelzny, 1915
 Zerynthia polyxena bryki Eisner, 1954 in Montenegro, Herzegovina border
 Zerynthia polyxena cantabrica Gomez-Bustille (Spain: Cantabrica)
 Zerynthia polyxena carmenae Sabariego et Martinez, 1991 in Bulgaria
 Zerynthia polyxena cassandra (Geyer, 1828) in south France, north Italy
 Zerynthia polyxena cassandra f. ochracea Staudinger, 1861
 Zerynthia polyxena cassandra f. vitrina Rothschild, 1918
 Zerynthia polyxena cassandra f. inornata Pionneau
 Zerynthia polyxena cassandra f. bella Neuburger
 Zerynthia polyxena cassandra f. reducta Železný, 1915
 Zerynthia polyxena cassandra f. quincunx Eisner
 Zerynthia polyxena cassandra f. microcreusa Verity, 1947
 Zerynthia polyxena cassandra f. deminuta Verity, 1947
 Zerynthia polyxena cassandra-clara Verity, 1947 in Croatia
 Zerynthia polyxena castiliana Ruhl, 1892 (transcastilia Mon)  (Central Spain: Castilia, Albarracín)
 Zerynthia polyxena castiliana f. derubescens Schultz
 Zerynthia polyxena castiliana f. honnorathii Boisduval, 1832 (henrietta Timmins)
 Zerynthia polyxena castiliana f. tristis Verity, 1906
 Zerynthia polyxena castiliana f. semitristis de Sagarra, 1930
 Zerynthia polyxena castiliana f. ornatissima Blachier, 1908
 Zerynthia polyxena castiliana f. nigricans Holland
 Zerynthia polyxena castiliana f. alicea Neuburger, 1903
 Zerynthia polyxena catalonica de Sagarra 1930 (Spain: Catalonia)
 Zerynthia polyxena catalonica f. semitristis de Sagarra, 1930
 Zerynthia polyxena caucasiae Nardelli & Hirschfeld, 2002 north west of Caucasus
 Zerynthia polyxena creusa Meigen, 1829 (central Italy: Ventimiglia (Verity, 1950), cf. Eisner, 1974!)
 Zerynthia polyxena decastroi Sala & Bollino, 1992 in Italy
 Zerynthia polyxena deminuta Verity, 1947 southern of France
 Zerynthia polyxena demnosia Freyer, 1833 (Dahl MS) (albanica Riemel], thusnelda Schultz) (= ssp. macedonia Eisner, 1974 (Macedonia, Thessalia, Dalmatia, Albania)
 Zerynthia polyxena demnosia f. quincunx Eisner
 Zerynthia polyxena demnosia f. vitrina Rothschild
 Zerynthia polyxena demnosia f. ochracea Staudinger, 1861
 Zerynthia polyxena gracilis Schultz, 1908 in north-east Turkey: Brusa, Karagja Dagh
 Zerynthia polyxena idaensis Eisner, 1974 in Crete
 Zerynthia polyxena idaensis f. rumina Linne, 1758
 Zerynthia polyxena latevittata (Verity, 1919) in Sicily
 Zerynthia polyxena latiaris Stichel, 1907 in south Italy: Calabria, Rome, Monti Albani
 Zerynthia polyxena linnea (Bryk, 1932) in Italy, Elba
 Zerynthia polyxena macedonia Eisner, 1974 in Macedonia
 Zerynthia polyxena michaelis Nardelli, 1993 in Italy
 Zerynthia polyxena microcreusa Verity, 1947 southern of France
 Zerynthia polyxena minima Gerhardinger, 1951 Spain: Toledo)
 Zerynthia polyxena nemorensis (Verity, 1919) in Italy: Toscana, Firenze.
 Zerynthia polyxena nigra Sijaric, 1989 in Bosnia
 Zerynthia polyxena padana Rocci, 1929 in north Italy: Piedmont, Lombardy, Turin
 Zerynthia polyxena patrizii Nardelli, 1993 in Italy
 Zerynthia polyxena petheri Romei, 1927 (south Spain: Sierra Nevada)
 Zerynthia polyxena petri (Bryk, 1932) in Greece, south Ukrainskaja: Cherson, Kiev, lower Juzinyi Bug, Krim
 Zerynthia polyxena polymnia (Millière, 1880) in Greece: Euboea
 Zerynthia polyxena reverdinii Fruhstorfer, 1908 in west and north Italy: Liguria.
 Zerynthia polyxena silana Storace, 1962 in Italy
 Zerynthia polyxena sontae Sijaric, 1989 in Serbia
 Zerynthia polyxena taygetana Rosen, 1929 in Greece: Taygetus, Peleponesos
 Zerynthia polyxena thesto Fruhstorfer, 1908 in south-west U.S.S.R.: lower Volga, Saratow, lower Don
 Zerynthia polyxena thesto f. rufescens Oberthür, 1879
 Zerynthia polyxena thesto f. muelleri Bryk, 1991
 Zerynthia polyxena thesto f. cellopura Eisner
 Zerynthia polyxena tristis de Lattin, 1950 in Turkey
 Zerynthia polyxena vipsania Hemming, 1941 (:latevittata Verity, 1919, a secondary homonym of latevittata Schultz, 1908: creusa Mann, nec Meigen, Dahl MS: polymnia Ragusa, 1906, (Sicily)

Distribution

Z. polyxena is widespread in the middle and southern Europe (southeastern France, Italy, Slovakia and Greece) covering all the Balkans and reaching the south of Kazakhstan and the Urals. Although they are widespread they occur only locally.

Habitat
These rare butterflies can be found in warm, sunny and open places such as grassy herb-rich meadows, vineyards, river banks, wetlands, cultivated areas, brushy places, wasteland, rocky cliffs and karst terrains, at an elevation of from 0 to 1,700 metres above sea level but usually below 900 metres.

Description

The southern festoon can reach a wingspan of 46–52 mm. The females have slightly longer wings, usually lighter colored than males. The basic color of the wings is yellow, with a complicated pattern of several black bands and spots.

On the edges of the hindwings they have a black sinuous line with a series of blue and red warning spots to deter potential predators (aposematism). The body is dark brown and bears red patches on the sides of the abdomen.

This species is rather similar to, and can be confused only with, the Spanish festoon (Z. rumina). The differences are in the presence of blue on the hind wings of Z. polyxena and the relatively lower amount of red on its forewings compared with Z. rumina. The ranges of these two species overlap only in southeast France.

The caterpillars of Z. polyxena are up to 35 millimeters long. They are initially black, then they are yellowish with six rows of fleshy orange and black spikes all over the body.

Biology
It is an early spring butterfly. Adults fly from April to June in a single brood. The adults are active for no more than three weeks. The females lay their eggs singly or in small groups at the bottom of the host plants. The eggs are spherical and whitish at first, bluish colored before hatching. The caterpillars feed on birthworts (mainly (Aristolochia clematitis, Aristolochia rotunda, Aristolochia pistolochia, Aristolochia pallida). The special food of the larvae provides the toxic substances which then also go to the adults, making them inedible. The young caterpillars feed at first on flowers and young shoots, while after the second molt they feed on leaves. The pupae stay linked to a support by a silk belt for wintering and the new adults hatch the next spring.

References

Bibliography
Capinera, J. L. (Ed.), Encyclopedia of Entomology, 4 voll., 2nd Ed., Dordrecht, Springer Science+Business Media B.V., 2008, pp. lxiii + 4346, LCCN 2008930112, OCLC 837039413.
Dapporto, L., Speciation in Mediterranean refugia and post-glacial expansion of Zerynthia polyxena (Lepidoptera, Papilionidae). J. Zool. Syst. Evol. Res., in press.doi: 10.1111/j.1439-0469.2009.00550.x
Higgins, L.G, Riley, N.D, 1970; A Field Guide to the Butterflies of Britain and Europe
Kükenthal, W. (Ed.), Handbuch der Zoologie / Handbook of Zoology, Band 4: Arthropoda - 2. Hälfte: Insecta - Lepidoptera, moths and butterflies, in Kristensen, N. P. (a cura di), Handbuch der Zoologie, Fischer, M. (Scientific Editor), Teilband/Part 35: Volume 1: Evolution, systematics, and biogeography, Berlino, New York, Walter de Gruyter, 1999 [1998], pp. x + 491, OCLC 174380917.
Nazari, V., Sperling, F.A.H. 2007; Mitochondrial DNA divergence and phylogeography in western Palaearctic Parnassiinae (Lepidoptera:Papilionidae): how many species are there? Insect Syst Evol 38:121–138.
Scoble, M. J., The Lepidoptera: Form, Function and Diversity, 2nd ed., London, Oxford University Press & Natural History Museum, 2011 [1992], pp. xi, 404, LCCN 92004297, OCLC 25282932.
Stehr, F. W. (Ed.), Immature Insects, 2 vol., 2nd ed. Dubuque, Iowa, Kendall/Hunt Pub. Co., 1991 [1987], pp. ix, 754, LCCN 85081922, OCLC 13784377.

External links

 Euro Butterflies by Matt Rowlings
 Schmetterling-raupe.de
 Butterfly Corner
 Catalogue of life
 DK – Pocket Nature

Polyxena
Butterflies described in 1775
Butterflies of Asia
Butterflies of Europe
Taxa named by Michael Denis
Taxa named by Ignaz Schiffermüller